Stocksunds Idrottsförening, Stocksunds IF, SIF, is a Swedish sportsclub in Stocksund, just north of Stockholm. The club was founded on 3 January 1935 and has had sections for bandy, ice hockey, association football, figure skating, handball, and floorball. In 2017, only the football section is active. The colours of the club are yellow and black and the team logo displays the Cedergren Tower, a well-known landmark in and around Stocksund.

At present, Stocksunds IF does not compete in the elite leagues in any sport but has a broad activity for youths. Ice hockey player Tommy Albelin played for Stocksunds IF when he was in his teens.

Sources 

Sports teams in Sweden
Defunct ice hockey teams in Sweden
Defunct bandy clubs in Sweden
Football clubs in Stockholm County
Association football clubs established in 1935
Bandy clubs established in 1935
Ice hockey clubs established in 1935
1935 establishments in Sweden